Longtharai is a 1986 first Kokborok film directed by Dipak Bhattacharya, adapted from Tripura’s former Health and Urban Development Minister and CPIM leader Bimal Sinha’s novel "Karachi theke Longtharai".

Production 
The 75-minute film's screenplay was created by Bhattacharya, who also directed it amid the intense political unrest that would engulf Tripura's hinterlands in the late 1980s. In the 1980s, shooting in celluloid with sync sound and color was a significant advance for aspiring filmmakers in Tripura. Only two prints of Longtharai were reportedly made, one of which is in the possession of the Government of Tripura, reportedly as a result of inadequate financial support and an exceedingly laborious post-production procedure during the celluloid era.

Bibliography 

 Bhattacharya, Dipak. Chalacchitra Prashange Tripura (Longtarai Chayachobir Chitranatya shoho). Agartala: Akshar Publications, 2000.
 Deb Barma Aloy; Debroy Prajapita. Cinema as Art and Popular Culture in Tripura: An Introduction. Agartala: Tribal Research and Cultural Institute, 2022.

See also 

 Kokborok Cinema
 List of Kokborok-language films

References 

Cinema of Tripura
Films shot in Tripura
Kokborok
1986 films
Kokborok-language films